The Terrace of the Leper King (or Leper King Terrace) (Preah Lean Sdach Kumlung) is located in the northwest corner of the Royal Square of Angkor Thom, Cambodia.

It was built in the Bayon style under Jayavarman VII, though its modern name derives from an 8th-century sculpture discovered at the site; . A datable inscription of the 14th-15th century identifies it with Dharmaraja, the "ruler of the order", another name of Yama, the Indic god of death.

The statue was called the "Leper King" because discolouration and moss growing on it was reminiscent of a person with leprosy, and also because of a Cambodian legend of an Angkorian king Yasovarman I who had leprosy. The name that the Cambodians know him by, however, is Dharmaraja, as this is what was etched at the bottom of the original statue.

The U-shaped structure is thought by some to have been used as a royal cremation site.

Legacy 
The play revolves around King Jayavarman VII returning triumphant from his battle against the Chams and commissions the temple of Bayon. After the announcement of the project, the king's perfect skin begins to show the first signs of leprosy. His leprosy spreads apace with the construction of the temple; he eventually goes blind and dies at its completion.

Gallery

References

External links
 Terrace of the Leper King - Comprehensive Photographic Documentation by khmer-heritage.de

Angkorian sites in Siem Reap Province
Cambodian legends